Erika Mészáros (born 24 June 1966 in Budapest) is a Hungarian sprint canoer who competed from the mid-1980s to the mid-1990s. Competing in three Summer Olympics, she won two medals in the K-4 500 m event with a gold in 1992 and a silver in 1988.

Mészáros also won eleven medals at the ICF Canoe Sprint World Championships with two golds (K-2 500 m and K-4 500 m: both 1986), eight silvers (K-2 500 m: 1989, 1990, 1991; K-2 5000 m: 1990, 1993; K-4 500 m: 1989, 1990, 1991), and a bronze (K-4 500 m: 1993).

Her father, György, won two Olympic canoeing silver medals at the 1960 Summer Olympics in Rome, earning them in the K-1 4 x 500 m relay and K-2 1000 m events.

Awards
 Hungarian kayaker of the Year (4): 1986, 1989, 1990, 1992
   Work Order of Merit of Hungarian People's Republic – Silver Cross (1988)
   Order of Merit of the Republic of Hungary – Small Cross (1992)
 Member of the Hungarian team of year (with Rita Kőbán, Éva Dónusz, Kinga Czigány): 1992

References
 
 
 
 
 Wallechinsky, David and Jaime Loucky (2008). "Canoeing: Women's Kayak Fours 500 Meters". In The Complete Book of the Olympics: 2008 Edition. London: Aurum Press. p. 495.

External links 
 

1966 births
Canoeists at the 1988 Summer Olympics
Canoeists at the 1992 Summer Olympics
Canoeists at the 1996 Summer Olympics
Hungarian female canoeists
Living people
Olympic canoeists of Hungary
Olympic gold medalists for Hungary
Olympic silver medalists for Hungary
Olympic medalists in canoeing
ICF Canoe Sprint World Championships medalists in kayak
Medalists at the 1992 Summer Olympics
Medalists at the 1988 Summer Olympics
Canoeists from Budapest
20th-century Hungarian women